Curio sulcicalyx is a small succulent plant in the family Asteraceae that is native to South Africa and Namibia.

Description
It is only 4 inches (10cm) tall and has tuberous roots, with dark green leaves that would have short white hairs. Flowers are white to mauve and may be yellow, which appear in spring.

References

sulcicalyx
Flora of South Africa
Flora of Namibia
Garden plants
Taxa named by N. E. Brown